"Cobwebs in Concrete" is a 1968 Australian TV play written by actor John Warwick. It aired on the ABC as part of the anthology show Wednesday Theatre immediately after The Queen's Bishop.
Australian TV drama was relatively rare at the time.

Plot
A bridge over the Sunda River in Bali collapses killing four adults and 22 children. An investigation results. The bridge was built by Dan Fenner, an ambitious man in his early thirties. The design of the bridge brought him much acclaim. Investigations reveal various jealousies and passions.

Cast
 Frank Wilson as Kruger, a financial tycoon
 Michael Duffield as Sir Miles Parker, chairman of the biggest construction group in England
 Wynn Roberts as Dan Fenner, a major bridge designer
 Ian Neal
 William Hodge as Cameron Fisher
 Peter Aanensen as Jason, a transport tycoon
 Lynn Lee
 Sheila Florence as Kathy
 Dennis Miller as Scott Harland

Production
Frank Wilson was better known as a "song and dance man" at the time. The play was made in Melbourne's ABC studios.

References

External links
 

1968 television plays
1968 Australian television episodes
1960s Australian television plays
Wednesday Theatre (season 4) episodes